Voria is a genus of flies in the family Tachinidae.

Species
Voria aurescens (Townsend, 1931)
Voria aurifrons (Townsend, 1892)
Voria capensis Villeneuve, 1935
Voria ciliata d'Aguilar, 1957
Voria erasmocoronadoi Fleming & Wood, 2017
Voria micronychia Zhao & Zhou, 1993
Voria parva (Johnson, 1920)
Voria pollyclari (Rocha-e-Silva, Lopes & Della Lucia, 1999)
Voria ruralis (Fallén, 1810)
Voria setosa (Townsend, 1914)

References

Dexiinae
Diptera of Europe
Diptera of Asia
Diptera of North America
Diptera of South America
Diptera of Australasia
Tachinidae genera
Taxa named by Jean-Baptiste Robineau-Desvoidy